Jacob Gudim Karlsen (born 24 July 2001, Lørenskog, Norway) is a Norwegian artistic gymnast. In 2018, he won the bronze medal in the vault event at the 2018 Summer Youth Olympics held in Buenos Aires, Argentina.

References

External links 
 
 

Living people
2001 births
Place of birth missing (living people)
Norwegian male artistic gymnasts
Gymnasts at the 2018 Summer Youth Olympics
21st-century Norwegian people